Matthew Brandon Ross (born January 3, 1970) is an American actor, director, and screenwriter. He is best known for his roles as Gavin Belson in the HBO series Silicon Valley, Glenn Odekirk in The Aviator, and Luis Carruthers in American Psycho.

Early life and education 
Ross was born in Greenwich, Connecticut, and raised in Eagle Point, Oregon. His parents divorced when he was young, and Ross was raised in what he described as "alternative living situations". His mother became interested in the Waldorf education philosophy and Ross spent time in England while his mother worked towards a teaching credential in Waldorf education. He earned a Bachelor of Fine Arts degree from the Juilliard School.

Career 
Ross garnered critical acclaim for his role as Alby Grant in the HBO series Big Love for five seasons. He also played Eddie Scott in the 2005 film Good Night, and Good Luck, for which he was nominated for a Screen Actors Guild Award for Outstanding Performance by a Cast in a Motion Picture. In 2011 and 2015, he played Charles Montgomery in the first and fifth seasons of FX's anthology series American Horror Story.

He wrote and directed the feature film Captain Fantastic, starring Viggo Mortensen, for which he won the Un Certain Regard Prize for Best Director at the 2016 Cannes Film Festival. Before that, Ross made seven short films, including The Language of Love, which premiered at the Sundance Film Festival. His feature film directorial debut, 28 Hotel Rooms, premiered at the Sundance Film Festival in 2012.

Personal life

He is married to the writer Phyllis Grant, with whom he has two children: Isabel "Bella" and Dashiell "Dash" Ross.

Filmography

Filmmaker

Films

Television

Actor

Film

Television

Awards and honors

References

External links
 

1970 births
20th-century American male actors
21st-century American male actors
American male film actors
American male television actors
Film directors from Connecticut
Living people
Male actors from Connecticut
People from Greenwich, Connecticut
Screenwriters from Connecticut
Juilliard School alumni
People from Eagle Point, Oregon
Male actors from Oregon
Actors from Oregon